Coronary reflex is the change of coronary diameter in response to chemical, neurological or mechanical stimulation of the coronary arteries.
The coronary reflexes are stimulated differently from the rest of the vascular system.

Causes of coronary constriction

Chemical
 N-nitro L-arginine
 indomethacin
 glibenclamide
 tetraethylammonium chloride
 caffeine

Other
 Cold

Causes of coronary dilation
Cocaine abuse frequently can cause a coronary spasm, resulting in a spontaneous myocardial infarction.

Chemical
 Versed (Midazolam): a coronary dilator. In midazolam's presence, dilation was unaffected by N-nitro L-arginine, indomethacin and glibenclamide.
 Tetraethylammonium chloride, an inhibitor of the BKCa K+ channel (a high conductance Ca2+-sensitive K+ channel), dose dependently attenuated the vasodilating effect of midazolam 
 Estrogen has been shown to abolish abnormal cold-induced coronary constriction.

References

Cardiology